Vedha is a 2022 Indian Kannada language action drama film written and directed by Harsha, and produced by Geeta Shivarajkumar under the banner Geeta Pictures in association with Zee Studios. The film stars  Shiva Rajkumar and Ganavi Laxman are in the lead roles and Umashree, Aditi Sagar, Shwetha Chengappa and Kuri Prathap in supporting roles. The film marks Shiva Rajkumar's 125th film and was released on 23 December 2022, coinciding with Christmas, where it received positive reviews from critics.

Plot 
In Mysore, a woman named Neela is harassed by a man in a bus; commuting to her workplace. Neela arrives home and tells about this to her grandmother Raama, a retired Inspector. Raama advises her to read a book titled Vedha, which revolves around a hooligan-turned vigilante named Vedha.

In 1980s, Vedha meets his daughter Kanaka, who is released from prison, and the duo set on a killing spree. They wander from one village and kill three persons: Inspector Rudra, Giri, Nanjappa. Vedha also rescues two women from being sold as bonded labourers and punishes those people responsible. Ramaa took charge as the Inspector, and along with constable Govindappa, begins to investigates the incidents and deduces that Vedha and Kanaka are behind this. From a lawyer named Girija, Ramaa learns about Vedha's past.

Past: Vedha leads a happy life with his wife Pushpa and daughter Kanaka. Later, Vedha is sent to prison for three days for a theft committed by Beera. One night in a drunken state, Giri, Beera, Kalaiyan and Nanjappa brutally assault Kanaka. Enraged by this, Pushpa attacks them only to get killed by them. Rudra also helps them to destroy the evidence, and gets Kanaka sent to juvenile prison. After learning this, Vedha kills the witness Chowdappa for false testimony; attacks Rudra (who survives later) and absconds from the village, waiting for Kanaka to get released from prison and exact vengeance.

Present: Vedha and Kanaka arrive to kill Kalaiyan, who later commits suicide out of guilt. They also arrive at Beera's house and decapitates Beera's wife, and later kills Beera. Ramaa arrives, along with Paari, a sex worker, and Vedha's friend Daya. Paari reveals that Daya was also involved in Kanaka's assault, and he was the one who informed their arrival to Beera. Paari also had tried to kill Daya many times, but the latter always managed to escape. Vedha gets enraged and kills Daya, thus avenging the injustice committed against Pushpa and Kanaka. Later, Vedha and Kanaka immerse Pushpa's ashes into the river and continues their vigilante activities.

After listening to Vedha's story, Neela finally gains newfound courage and heads back to work. While heading to her workplace, Neela gets harassed again by the same man in the bus, only for her to stab his penis with a ball pen.

Cast 
 Shiva Rajkumar as Vedha
 Bharath Sagar as Rudra
 Ganavi Laxman as Pushpa, Vedha's wife
 Shwetha Chengappa as Paari, a sex worker
 Umashree as Shakri, Vedha's best friend
 Aditi Sagar as Kanaka, Vedha's daughter
 Veena Ponnappa as Inspector Ramaa
 Raghu Shivamogga as Daya, Vedha's friend
 Lasya Nagaraj
 Jaggapa as Chinayya
 Cheluvaraj as Beera
 Prasanna as Nanjappa
 Vinay Bidappa as Giri
 Sanjeev 
 Kuri Prathap as a bus conductor

Music
The music of the film is composed by Arjun Janya. The first single titled "Gillakko Shiva" was released on 27 November 2022. The second single titled "Pushpa Pushpa" was released on 11 December 2022. The third single titled "Junjappa" was released on 15 December 2022. The fourth single titled "Chinnumari" was released on 26 December 2022.

Release

Theatrical 
The film was released theatrically on 23 December 2022. The Telugu dubbed version titled Shiva Vedha was released on 9 February 2023.

Home media 
The digital streaming rights of the film is sold to ZEE5. The film was digitally premiered on the streaming platform from 10 February 2023 in Hindi, Kannada, Tamil, Telugu and Malayalam.

Reception 
Sridevi S of The Times of India gave 3.5 out of 5 stars and wrote "Vedha deals with an untouched, sensitive topic of child abuse. It is a perfect blend of commercial elements with a strong message about the harassment faced by women on a daily basis. The narration could have been better, but the message and stunning performances keep the film afloat." Y. Maheswara Reddy of Bangalore Mirror gave 3.5 out of 5 stars and wrote that the film is "must watch" for Shivarajkumar's fans. Swaroop Kodur of OTTplay gave 3 out of 5 stars and wrote "Vedha,, that said, isn't devoid of concerns and one might find the transgression of the film a bit too alarming and implausible, given the sensitivity of the subject matter. But the film has the heart in the right place and aside from all the contrivances, it is an enjoyable watch."

Jagadish Angadi of Deccan Herald gave 2.5 out of 5 stars and wrote "Only the director knows why he set the film in the 1960s and named it as Vedha. There are no justifications for his creative decisions in the film" and "Shivarajkumar’s 100th film Jogayya fell flat after carrying massive hype. His 125th film is all set to meet a similar fate. However, the seasoned actor can’t be blamed for the director’s blunders." Shuklaji from The New Minute gave 2.5 out of 5 stars and wrote "The film is riveting in parts but a majority of it is flawed and compelling only on the surface."

Latha Srinivasan of India Today gave 2 out of 5 stars and wrote "Vedha has been smartly written by Harsha so as to keep the audience engaged throughout the movie – while there is action, there is plenty of sentiment and he chooses to show Vedha as someone who believes in women empowerment and standing up for women’s rights. This is sure to strike a chord with Shiva Rajkumar’s fans, as the Kannada star is choosing stories that have more meaning to society."

References

External links 
 

2020s Kannada-language films